The 2011 Manitoba Lotteries Men's Curling Classic was held from October 7 to 10 at the Brandon Curling Club in Brandon, Manitoba as part of the 2011–12 World Curling Tour. The purse for the event was CAD$40,000. The event was played in a triple knockout format.

Teams

Results

A Event

B Event

C Event

Playoffs

External links

 
2011 in Canadian curling
2011 in Manitoba
October 2011 sports events in Canada
Curling competitions in Brandon, Manitoba